Reptilian may refer to:

 Reptiles and their qualities
Reptilian humanoid, anthropomorphic reptiles in folklore and fiction
List of reptilian humanoids
Reptilian conspiracy theory, fringe theory alleging the existence of shape-shifting reptilian aliens
 Reptilian (film), the American title for the 1999 South Korean kaiju film remake of Yonggary (1967)
 Reptilian (album), album by the Norwegian extreme metal group Keep of Kalessin
 "Reptilia", music single by The Strokes
 Reptilian complex (brain theory)
 Reptilians (Starfucker album), album by the American electronica band STRFKR
 Reptiloid (film), a 2013 Croatian short film